Sherwood Secondary School is a secondary school in Hamilton, Ontario. It is operated by the Hamilton-Wentworth District School Board. The school opened in 1967. 2013-2014 enrollment was 1050 students. Sherwood uses the Ontario Secondary School Literacy Test (OSSLT) to assess Grade 10 students' skills in reading and writing. Successful completion of the test is one of 32 requirements students require to earn an Ontario Secondary School Diploma. The school offers special education classes. In 2022, the school moved from its original site (25 High St, Hamilton ON) to the refurbished 75 Palmer Rd site (previously Barton Secondary School), to conduct renovations on the original building due to asbestos concerns on the second floor. Construction is currently ongoing.

History
Sherwood Secondary School was founded in 1967. The school is named after the Sherwood Forest Survey area of Hamilton Mountain.

See also
List of high schools in Ontario

References

External links
Sherwood Secondary School profile
Sherwood Secondary School Website

High schools in Hamilton, Ontario
Educational institutions established in 1967
1967 establishments in Ontario